Latin Pop Airplay (also referred to as Latin Pop Songs) is a record chart published on Billboard magazine and a subchart of the Latin Airplay chart. The chart focuses on Latin pop music, namely Spanish-language pop music. It was established by the magazine on October 8, 1994 as a subchart of the Hot Latin Songs chart until October 2012 when the Hot Latin Songs changed its methodology. The first number-one song on the chart was Mañana by Cristian Castro. This chart features only singles or tracks and like most Billboard charts, is based on airplay; the radio charts are compiled using information tracked by from Nielsen Broadcast Data Systems (BDS), which electronically monitors radio stations in more than 140 markets across the United States. The audience charts cross-reference BDS data with listener information compiled by the Arbitron ratings system to determine the approximate number of audience impressions made for plays in each daypart. With the issue dated August 15, 2020, Billboard revamped the chart to reflect overall airplay of Latin pop music on Latin radio stations. Instead of ranking songs being played on Latin-pop stations, rankings will be determined by the amount of airplay Latin-pop songs receive on stations that play Latin music regardless of genre. The current number one song is "Bzrp Music Sessions, Vol. 53" by Bizarrap and Shakira.

Records

Artists with the most number-one hits

Artists with the most top-ten hits

Artists with the most entries

Top-ten songs of all-time (1994–2017)
In 2017, Billboard magazine compiled a ranking of the 20 best-performing songs on the chart since its inception in 1994. The chart is based on the most weeks the song spent on top of the chart. For songs with the same number of weeks at number one, they are ranked by the most weeks in the top ten, followed by most total weeks on the chart.

Songs with the most weeks at number one

Number-one debuts

Number-one song of the year

Decade-end charts
2000s: "No Me Doy por Vencido" by Luis Fonsi

See also
Hot Latin Songs
Latin Pop Albums
Latin pop

References

External links
Current Billboard Latin Pop Airplay 

Billboard charts
Latin pop